Maycon de Andrade Barberan (born 15 July 1997), known as just Maycon, is a Brazilian footballer who plays as midfielder for Brazilian side Corinthians, on loan from Ukrainian side Shakhtar Donetsk.

Career

Early life
Maycon began playing for Corinthians academy at the age of twelve and had a very successful campaign. He won the 2014 and 2015 U20 Campeonato Paulista, 2014 U20 Campeonato Brasileiro, the 2015 Copa São Paulo de Futebol Júnior, including scoring the winning goal during the final.

Corinthians
Maycon made his professional debut on 11 February 2016, as he started on Corinthians 2–1 victory against Capivariano at Arena Corinthians. He scored his first goal in a 3–0 away win against Botafogo-SP on March 13.

Ponte Preta (loan)
On 14 July, Maycon was loaned to fellow Série A club Ponte Preta.

Shakhtar Donetsk
On 17 June 2018 Maycon was transferred to Ukrainian Premier League club Shakhtar Donetsk and signed 5-year contract.

Corinthians (loan)
On 31 March 2022, Shakhtar Donetsk confirmed that Maycon had joined Corinthians on loan until the end of 2022.

Career statistics

Honours
Corinthians
Campeonato Brasileiro Série A: 2017
Campeonato Paulista: 2017, 2018

Shakhtar Donetsk
Ukrainian Premier League: 2018–19, 2019–20
Ukrainian Cup: 2018–19
Ukrainian Super Cup: 2021

References

External links
 

1997 births
Living people
Brazilian footballers
Brazilian expatriate footballers
Expatriate footballers in Ukraine
Sport Club Corinthians Paulista players
Associação Atlética Ponte Preta players
Footballers from São Paulo
Association football midfielders
FC Shakhtar Donetsk players
Ukrainian Premier League players
Brazilian expatriate sportspeople in Ukraine